Murray Bridge East is a semi-rural satellite locality of Murray Bridge in South Australia east of the Murray River and the eponymous bridge. Its boundaries were formalised in March 2000 to cover a portion of land immediately across the river to the east of the main Murray Bridge conurbation. It is bounded on the southwest by the Adelaide-Melbourne railway line and the defunct Rabila Railway Station is thus on the locality's southern boundary. The Karoonda Highway motor traffic route commences at Murray Bridge East and heads northeast through Karoonda to Loxton.

See also
 List of cities and towns in South Australia

References 

Towns in South Australia